Sir Constantine Trent Champion de Crespigny,  (pron. də kre'pəni) (5 March 1882 – 27 October 1952), generally referred to as C. T. C. de Crespigny or Sir Trent de Crespigny or Trent Champion de Crespigny, was a medical doctor, clinical pathologist, academic and hospital administrator in Adelaide, South Australia.

Early life and career
De Crespigny was born on 5 March 1882 in Queenscliff, Victoria (at that time spelled Queenscliffe), second son of Philip Champion de Crespigny, general manager of the Bank of Victoria (which became the Commercial Banking Company of Sydney), and Annie Frances (née Chauncy). Philip's father, police magistrate Philip Robert Champion de Crespigny (1817 – 1889), was great-nephew of Sir Claude Champion de Crespigny, 1st Baronet. He was educated at Brighton Grammar School, then enrolled as a medical student at Trinity College, University of Melbourne. After graduating with honours in 1903, he was appointed resident medical officer at Melbourne Hospital, and later at the Women's Hospital. In 1907, he began private practice in Western Victoria, then in Fitzroy, Victoria, and also served as honorary physician to St Vincent's Hospital.

In 1908, de Crespigny was appointed medical superintendent of the Adelaide Hospital, and four years later returned to private practice with rooms on North Terrace, at the time Adelaide's equivalent to Harley Street, London or Macquarie Street, Sydney. He became a hospital "honorary," and also lectured in pathology at the University of Adelaide. He continued, in addition, as director of the hospital's pathology and bacteriology laboratory.

Military service
Captain de Crespigny joined the 31st Light Horse Field Ambulance, Citizens Military Force, and was promoted lieutenant colonel in January 1913, captain (provisional) in January 1914, and major in January 1915. He joined the Australian Imperial FOrce for service in the First World War and as Lieutenant Colonel de Crespigny left South Australia on 20 May 1915 aboard RMS Mooltan, bound for Alexandria, Egypt, where he would serve as registrar and secretary of the 3rd Australian General Hospital.

De Crespigny left Egypt for Gallipoli in August 1915, then on 28 September to the army hospital at Mudros, on Lemnos, where he served as second in command. From there to Alexandria on 27 January 1916 and Heliopolis 20 February, Marseilles in April, then put in charge of the 1st Australian General Hospital at Rouen, where he was mentioned in despatches while under command of General Sir Charles Monro. He spent much of the period 6 November 1916 to 3 March 1917 in hospital suffering cholecystitis. He returned to command at Rouen as temporary colonel and was mentioned in despatches 9 June 1917 by Sir Douglas Haig and was recommended for the Distinguished Service Order. He was again hospitalised, from 2 to 12 August 1917, and on 18 September promoted to colonel. He was transferred to London headquarters on 13 October and returned to Australia on 1 November, where he was "struck off strength".

De Crespigny re-enlisted on 25 June 1918 and left aboard SS Gaika on 6 August, disembarking in London on 13 October, where he served as consulting physician at AIF headquarters. He left for Australia on 16 March 1919, and with Lieutenant Colonel Cudmore and Colonel Michael "Mick" Downey transshipped to Dunluce Castle at Alexandria on 7 April, arrived in Adelaide on 13 May, and his appointment was terminated 28 May. While in England he was admitted as a member of the Royal College of Physicians.

Return to civilian life
De Crespigny returned to his previous life as a university lecturer, physician and hospital administrator:
In 1923 he succeeded Harry Swift as Lecturer in Medicine at the University of Adelaide.
In 1927 he was appointed to the Hospital advisory board on the resignation of Bronte Smeaton.
In December 1928  he succeeded Dr. William Ray as Dean of the Faculty of Medicine, University of Adelaide.
He was largely responsible for creation of the Institute of Medical and Veterinary Science (IMVS), for which the foundation stone was laid in August 1937 and opened May 1939. He was the board's first chairman.
The memorial plaque to Sir Joseph Verco in the Frome Road building was instituted at de Crespigny's instigation.  
He was appointed to the Royal Adelaide Hospital Advisory Committee in 1940.
He was vice-president of the South Australian Council of Speech Science and Speech Therapy from its foundation in August 1947.
He was president of the Royal Australasian College of Physicians 1942–43, succeeded by Harold Ritchie of New South Wales.
In 1945 he was sent to the US to investigate retraining of American battlefield doctors to civilian practices.

De Crespigny had a home at 12 Strangways Terrace, North Adelaide and from 1934 or earlier a (summer ?) residence "St Barberie", now at 9 Blackburn Drive, Crafers, but before subdivision on a much larger property. The house was built for Samuel Tomkinson, who named it "Mangona". close to Summit Road. It narrowly escaped total destruction in the 1943 bushfire.

De Crespigny died of hypertensive cardio-vascular disease at his Adelaide Hills home aged 70, after having spent some time in hospital. He had for a long time suffered from heart trouble, which had been accepted by the Totally and Permanently Incapacitated board as related to his war service.

Publications
While in America in 1945, de Crespigny wrote several articles for the Adelaide Advertiser on medical subjects. He also contributed notable articles to medical and scientific publications.

Recognition
He was awarded a Distinguished Service Order in the 1917 Birthday Honours list
He was awarded a Colonial Auxiliary Forces Officers' Decoration c. 1927.
A knighthood was conferred on him in the 1941 New Year Honours.
His portrait, c. 1951 by Ivor Hele, hung in the foyer of the Institute of Medical and Veterinary Science, now SA Pathology, Frome Road, Adelaide.

Family
The family were of the French nobility, descending from Claude Champion de Crespigny, Sieur de Crespigny, whose three sons became free denizens of England by Act of Parliament, passed 5 March 1690.

Sir Constantine de Crespigny married Beatrix Hughes (23 April 1884 – 11 November 1943) on 11 September 1906 at Beaufort, Victoria. She was a noted worker for MBHA and other charities. They had two sons and two daughters.
Col. (Richard) Geoffrey "Geoff" Champion de Crespigny M.B.. B.S (Melb.), O.B.E. (16 June 1907 – 12 February 1966) married Kathleen Cavenagh Mainwaring Cudmore (27 June 1908 – 11 June 2013) on 10 June 1933. A widow, she married again, to George William Symes (1896–1980) on 30 March 1967. Kathleen was a daughter of Sir Arthur Cudmore. 
Nancy de Crespigny (27 November 1910 – 6 December 2003) married Hallam Movius (28 November 1907 – 30 May 1987) in London on 25 September 1936. Both were archaeologists; Hallam served with US military in WWII; by 1953 was a professor at Harvard University
Margaret "Peggy" de Crespigny (1 January 1919 – 1989) served with Signals Unit during WWII, married Cornelis "Kees" in't Veld (15 February 1908 - 1994) c. 1946, lived Rangoon, Voorburg, Netherlands, Karachi, Pakistan and later settling in Melbourne
Adrian Norman Champion de Crespigny (1 January 1919 – 1993 ) a twin, he suffered brain injury from birth.
Philip Champion de Crespigny (18 June 1879 – 14 July 1918), Dr. Francis George Travers "Frank" Champion de Crespigny (23 September 1892 – 19 December 1968) of Ararat, Victoria, Air Vice Marshal Hugh Vivian Champion de Crespigny (8 April 1897 – 20 June 1969), Royalieu Dana "Roy" Champion de Crespigny (11 November 1905 – 10 February 1985) and Group Captain Claude Montgomery Champion de Crespigny, C.B.E. (1908– ) also with the Royal Air Force, were his brothers.

Sir Constantine de Crespigny married secondly Mary Birks Jolley (1915 – 1994), a "music through movement" teacher of "Rendlesham", Wentworth, NSW on 13 December 1945, quietly at the Lady Chapel, St Peter's Cathedral. They had one daughter, Charlotte Francis de Crespigny (1948 – ), a professor in the field of drug and alcohol nursing at the University of Adelaide.

Mary de Crespigny was a qualified exponent of the Dalcroze method of music education in recognition of her "long and faithful work" with Heather Gell, and on the recommendation of Anne Addison, principal of the Kindergarten Training College in Adelaide. She was a Licentiate of Music, Australia; a Licentiate of the Royal Schools of Music, London; and a member of the Australian Music Examinations Board. She lectured in music education at the Kindergarten College, was a supervisor of music in the Kindergarten Union kindergartens. She also ran eurhythmics classes at several private secondary schools and at Adelaide High School.

References

External links
Blog by Anne Young, a descendant

1882 births
1952 deaths
People educated at Brighton Grammar School
People educated at Trinity College (University of Melbourne)
Australian Army officers
Australian Companions of the Distinguished Service Order
Australian hospital administrators
Australian Knights Bachelor
Australian military personnel of World War I
Australian pathologists
Academic staff of the University of Adelaide
Fellows of the Royal Australasian College of Physicians